Lemonade is an alternative dance band from San Francisco, California, now residing in Brooklyn, New York. The band's music consists of an eccentric amalgam of electronic, world, and rock music influences, ranging from dubstep to caribbean. The band was formed in 2005 and is made up of vocalist Callan Clendenin, bassist Ben Steidel, and drummer Alex Pasternak. The group gained notoriety after moving to New York and releasing its self-titled debut in 2008, and Pure Moods EP in 2010. Several tracks from each of their releases have also been remixed by well-known artists like Delorean, Gold Panda, and Twin Shadow.

History

The band formed in 2005, in San Francisco, after the three were booked to play a live show two weeks after forming, having previously written no material. The first set, though mostly improvised, was well received, motivating the band to continue making music. With band members influenced by a variety of musical forms, the band soon found appeal among a diverse array of genres, allowing them to play a wide range of venues throughout the Bay Area, in various settings. Upon moving to Brooklyn, the band found wider success after releasing its debut and playing shows with well-known acts like Delorean and Tanlines. They are scheduled to perform at the American Music Awards of 2014 during the pre-show on November 23, 2014

The band is signed with record label True Panther Sounds and is scheduled to release the follow-up to its debut album on May 29, 2012. The release of the album, Diver, will coincide with North American tour dates opening for Neon Indian throughout the Spring.

Discography

Albums 
 Lemonade (2008, True Panther Sounds)
 Diver (2012)
 Minus Tide (2014, Cascine)

Singles
"Big Weekend" (2009)

EPs 
 Pure Moods EP (2010, True Panther Sounds)

References

External links
 Lemonade Tumblr
 Lemonade on MySpace

American dance music groups
Musical groups from San Francisco
Cascine artists